Mount Theodore is a mountain 4 nautical miles (7 km) southeast of Mount Inverleith on the south side of Bagshawe Glacier, near the west coast of Graham Land. Named by Scottish geologist David Ferguson who made a geological reconnaissance in this vicinity from the whale catcher Hanka in 1913.

Mountains of Graham Land
Danco Coast